Mian Khalid Mehmood is a Pakistani politician who is the current Provincial Minister of Punjab for Disaster Management, in office since 13 September 2018. He was a member of the Provincial Assembly of the Punjab from August 2018 till May 2022.

Early life and education
He was born on 1 October 1960 in Sheikhupura, Pakistan.

He graduated from the University of the Punjab in 2002 and received a degree of Bachelor of Arts.

Political career
He was elected to the Provincial Assembly of the Punjab as a candidate of Pakistan Muslim League (Q) (PML-Q) from Constituency PP-167 (Sheikhupura-VI) in 2002 Pakistani general election. He received 16,987 votes and defeated Chaudhry Ghulam Nabi, a candidate of Pakistan Muslim League (N) (PML-N).

He ran for the seat of the Provincial Assembly of the Punjab as a candidate of PML-Q from Constituency PP-167 (Sheikhupura-VI) in 2008 Pakistani general election but was unsuccessful. He received 11,554 votes and lost the seat to Chaudhry Ghulam Nabi, a candidate of PML-N.

He ran for the seat of the Provincial Assembly of the Punjab as an independent candidate from Constituency PP-167 (Sheikhupura-VI) in 2013 Pakistani general election but was unsuccessful. He received 11,963 votes and lost the seat to Muhammad Arif Khan Sindhila.

He was re-elected to the Provincial Assembly of the Punjab as a candidate of Pakistan Tehreek-e-Insaf (PTI) from Constituency PP-140 (Sheikhupura-VI) in 2018 Pakistani general election.

On 12 September 2018, he was inducted into the provincial Punjab cabinet of Chief Minister Sardar Usman Buzdar. On 13 September 2018, he was appointed as Provincial Minister of Punjab for Disaster Management. He de-seated due to vote against party policy for Chief Minister of Punjab election  on 16 April 2022.

References

Living people
Pakistan Tehreek-e-Insaf MPAs (Punjab)
Provincial ministers of Punjab
1960 births
Punjab MPAs 2002–2007
Punjab MPAs 2018–2023
Pakistan Muslim League (Q) MPAs (Punjab)